The Apple Display Connector (ADC) is a proprietary modification of the DVI connector that combines analog and digital video signals, USB, and power all in one cable. It was used in later versions of the Apple Studio Display, including the final 17" CRT model, and most versions of the widescreen Apple Cinema Display, after which Apple adopted standard DVI connectors on later models.  

First implemented in the July 2000 Power Mac G4 and G4 Cube, ADC disappeared from displays in June 2004 when Apple introduced the aluminum-clad 20" (51 cm), 23" (58 cm), and 30" (76 cm) Apple Cinema Displays, which feature separate DVI, USB and FireWire connectors, and their own power supplies. An ADC port was still included with the Power Mac G5 until April 2005, when new models meant the only remaining Apple product with an ADC interface was the single processor Power Mac G5 introduced in October 2004. This single processor Power Mac G5 was discontinued soon after in June 2005.

Compatibility

The Apple Display Connector is physically incompatible with a standard DVI connector. The Apple DVI to ADC Adapter, which cost $149US at launch but was in 2002 available for $99US, takes USB and DVI connections from the computer, adds power from its own integrated power supply, and combines them into an ADC output, allowing ADC monitors to be used with DVI-based machines. 

On some models of Power Mac G4 the ADC connector replaced the DVI connector. This change necessitated a passive ADC to DVI adapter to use a DVI monitor.

The ADC carries up to 100 W of power, an insufficient amount to run most 19-inch (48 cm) or bigger CRTs widely available during ADC's debut, nor can it run contemporary flat panels marketed for home entertainment (many of which support DVI or VGA connections) without an adapter. The power limit was an important factor for Apple to abandon ADC when it launched the 30-inch (76 cm) Apple Cinema HD Display.

On newer DVI-based displays lacking ADC, Apple still opted for a single "ganged cable" that connects the separate signal cables to each other so they cannot tangle. Such cables, however, employ standard DVI, power, USB and FireWire connectors, avoiding drawbacks to ADC. Beginning in 2008, Apple began transitioning away from DVI, adopting the increasingly common DisplayPort signalling standard, and developed their own Mini DisplayPort connector beginning with the first LED-backlit Cinema Displays. As of 2013, Apple no longer uses a DVI-based interface for any of its displays.

Apple no longer supports ADC adapters or monitors.

Pin 3 and 11
Power is supplied to the ADC port by an additional finger connector on the video card, which plugs into a slot on the motherboard between the AGP slot and the back panel of the computer; on G4 Macs, some power is also sent through AGP pins 3 and 11. When ADC was introduced, AGP pins 3 and 11 were unassigned. In AGP 8x, pins 3 and 11 were assigned, so because of that, G4s are not directly compatible with AGP 8x. G5 Macs draw all power from the finger connector and therefore are 8x compatible. To use an AGP 8x card in a G4, pins 3 and 11 must be somehow disabled; this can be done by placing tape over the conductive part of the pin, slicing the PCB traces, or on some cards, desoldering surface mount resistors.

See also
 Apple Displays
 HDI-45 connector (a previous attempt by Apple to integrate other interfaces into a video connector) 
 List of display interfaces

References

External links
Apple Unveils All New Family of Displays to Complement Power Mac G4 Cube and Power Mac G4
"The Apple Display Connector (ADC)" on Low End Mac

Digital display connectors
Apple Inc. hardware
Apple Inc. displays